Paynesville Maritime Museum is a small museum in Paynesville, Victoria, Australia, dedicated to the maritime history of Paynesville and the Gippsland Lakes.

Paynesville became a significant fishing port on the Gippsland coast of Victoria in the 19th century, supplying fresh fish to Melbourne. The town was also a port of call for steamships and a centre of shipbuilding. It is today a popular tourist destination for recreational boating, fishing and other water based activities.

The museum opened its doors in March 2014. It is located on Gilsenan Reserve, Paynsville, and is open from 8.30 am till 12.30 pm on the second Sunday of each month.

It produces a monthly e-bulletin and a journal twice a year for members.

References

Maritime museums in Victoria (Australia)
East Gippsland
2014 establishments in Australia
Museums established in 2014
Tourist attractions in Victoria (Australia)